Turmiel is a hamlet located in the municipality of Maranchón, in Guadalajara province, Castilla–La Mancha, Spain. As of 2020, it has a population of 7.

Geography 
Turmiel is located 122km east-northeast of Guadalajara, Spain.

References

Populated places in the Province of Guadalajara